The following tables provide a comparison of numerical analysis software.

Applications

General

Operating system support 
The operating systems the software can run on natively (without emulation).

Language features 
Colors indicate features available as

Libraries

General

Operating-system support 
The operating systems the software can run on natively (without emulation).

See also 
 Comparison of computer algebra systems
 Comparison of deep-learning software
 Comparison of statistical packages
 List of numerical-analysis software

Footnotes

References 

Numerical analysis software